Azerbaijan will compete at the 2019 World Athletics Championships in Doha, Qatar, from 27 September to 6 October 2019. Azerbaijan will be represented by 4 athletes.

Results

Men
Track and road events

Field events

Women  

Field events

References

External links
Doha｜WCH 19｜World Athletics

Nations at the 2019 World Athletics Championships
World Athletics
2019